James Archibald Campbell House is a historic home located at Buies Creek, Harnett County, North Carolina. It was built in 1891, and is a -story, rectangular frame dwelling with projecting pavilions at the front corners of the main facade.  It was the home of James Archibald Campbell (1862–1934) who founded Campbell University (originally Buies Creek Academy) in 1887.

It was listed on the National Register of Historic Places in 1977.

References

Houses on the National Register of Historic Places in North Carolina
Houses completed in 1891
Houses in Harnett County, North Carolina
National Register of Historic Places in Harnett County, North Carolina
1891 establishments in North Carolina